Healer is a 2014–2015 South Korean television series starring Ji Chang-wook, Park Min-young, and Yoo Ji-tae. It aired on KBS2 from December 8, 2014 to February 10, 2015 on Mondays and Tuesdays at 22:00 for 20 episodes.

Though the drama received modest ratings in its home country, it gained a fanbase overseas and made Ji Chang-wook known outside Korea.

Synopsis
A decades-old incident involving a group of five friends who ran an illegal pro-democracy broadcasting station during the Fifth Republic in South Korea brings together three different people—an illegal "night courier" with the codename "Healer" (Ji Chang-wook) who possesses top-notch fighting skills, a reporter from a second-rate tabloid news website (Park Min-young), and a famous journalist at a major broadcast station (Yoo Ji-tae). While trying to uncover the truth from that 1992 incident and a series of present day murders, they grow into honest reporters who try to blur the lines of conflict between truth and reality, even if that means fighting media honchos.

Cast

Main
Ji Chang-wook as Seo Jung-hu/Park Bong-soo/Healer
Park Si-jin as young Jung-hu
Go Woo-rim as child Jung-hu
Choi Jung-hu as toddler Jung-hu
An illegal "night courier" who works under the alias "Healer". Renowned for being the best in his field, Jung-hu is equipped not only with advanced technology and a trusty hacker sidekick, but also his superb fighting skills. He will perform any task except anything involving murder. His ultimate goal is to save money and buy an uninhabited island off the coast of Panama and to live there alone, but that changes after being given an order by his client, Kim Mun-ho, to find and protect a girl named Young-shin from the people who want her dead but he later falls in love with Young-shin.

Park Min-young as Chae Young-shin/Oh Ji-an
Kim So-yeon as young Young-shin
Shin Soo-yeon as 10-year-old Ji-an
Park Ji-so as 8-year-old Ji-an
Ku Geon-min as 5-year-old Ji-an
A strong-willed and quirky internet news reporter who dreams of becoming a legendary reporter. However, her dreams are put to the test when she finds out about her hidden past as the lost child Oh Ji-an. Due to her abusive past, Young-shin is traumatized and suffers from panic attacks whenever she sees violence. She later falls in love with her protector, Jung-hu.
Yoo Ji-tae as Kim Mun-ho
Kim Seung-chan as young Mun-ho
Lee Woo-joo as child Mun-ho
A star reporter, and brother to Kim Mun-sik, the CEO of a large news company. His goal is to last each day and to find Oh Ji-an, a supposedly dead child whom he suspects to still be alive. He pays Jung-hu (as "Healer") to find and protect Ji-an (now known as Young-shin) from the people that want her dead out of guilt for not fully investigating the truth about a 1992 incident that ended in the tragic deaths of two out of five best friends, and the crippling of a third.

Supporting
Kim Mi-kyung as Jo Min-ja, Hacker Ahjumma, a former detective specializing in cyber crimes
Oh Kwang-rok as Ki Young-jae, Jung-hoo's teacher (and the first "Healer"), one of five friends from the past
Choi Dong-gu as young Young-jae, Motorcycle rider and distractor during the illegal radio broadcasts
Taemi as Kang Dae-yong, "Healer's" assistant
Ji Il-joo as Seo Joon-seok, Jung-hoo's father, an engineer of the illegal radio station and later a photographer working with Oh Gil-han
Lee Kyung-shim as Jung-hoo's mother
Song Ji-in as young Jung-hoo's mother 
Park Sang-myun as Chae Chi-soo, Young-shin's adoptive father, a lawyer specializing in defending clients accused of burglary who also runs a café where he has employed many of his former clients
Woo Hyun as Chul-min, a former convict and one of Chae Chi-soo's clients who now works at the café
Park Won-sang as Jang Byung-se, head of "Someday News," an internet tabloid news site where Chae Young-shin works
Choi Seung-kyung as Yeo Gi-ja, "Reporter Yeo" at "Someday News"
Park Sang-won as Kim Moon-sik, one of the initial five friends, now a highly successful CEO of a news agency
Son Seung-won as young Moon-sik, driver of the truck from which the five friends ran their illegal radio station
Do Ji-won as Choi Myung-hee, Young-shin's biological mother, living in the present with Kim Moon-sik and using a wheelchair
Jung Hye-in as young Myung-hee, one of the lead reporters in the illegal radio station
Woo Hee-jin as Kang Min-jae, news director at "ABS News," where Kim Moon-ho works at the start of the story and also his love interest
Jang Sung-beom as Lee Jong-soo, Kim Moon-ho's assistant
Park Sang-wook as Bae Sang-soo, head of a rival "night courier" agency
Hong Seung-jin as Yo-yo, employed by Bae Sang-soo
Jo Han-chul as Yoon Dong-won, a detective specializing in cyber crimes, formerly Jo Min Ja's hoobae
Oh Jong-hyuk as Oh Gil-han, Young-shin's biological father, one of the lead reporters in the illegal radio station and a regular reporter after the fall of the Fifth Republic
Jung Gyu-soo as Oh Tae-won, Moon-sik's secretary and agent of "The Elder"
Kim Ri-na as Joo Yeon-hee, an actress who turns to Chae Young-shin and her father for help
Choi Jong-won as Park Jung-dae, "The Elder," a shadowy figure operating behind the scenes and the CEO of Omega Holdings formerly known as Omega Venture Capital.
Lee Moon-sik as Go Sung-chul (cameo, ep 1)
Nam Hee-seok (cameo, ep 9)
Jeon Hye-bin as Kim Jae-yoon (cameo, ep 20)
 Jung Hae-kyun as Hwang Jae-gook
 Choi Jung-won as Lee Jun-bin

Ratings

Original soundtrack

Awards and nominations

References

External links
  
 
 
 

2014 South Korean television series debuts
2015 South Korean television series endings
Korean Broadcasting System television dramas
Korean-language television shows
South Korean action television series
South Korean romance television series
Television shows written by Song Ji-na
Television series about journalism
Television series by Kim Jong-hak Production